Lal Bahadur Nagar Assembly constituency is a constituency of Telangana Legislative Assembly, India. Created shortly before the 2009 general elections, it is one among 14 constituencies in Ranga Reddy district. It is part of 24 constituencies of GHMC and part of Malkajgiri Lok Sabha constituency. It covers the city of Lal Bahadur Nagar and its surroundings.

Extent of the constituency
It is a newly formed constituency, created just before the 2009 general election; as per Delimitation Act of 2002.

The assembly constituency presently comprises the following neighbourhoods:

Members of Legislative Assembly

Election results

Assembly election, 2018

Assembly election, 2014

References

Assembly constituencies of Telangana
Ranga Reddy district